Rolea B'ier may refer to:

 Rolea B'ier District, a district of Kampong Chhnang province
 Rolea B'ier (town), the capital of Rolea B'ier district
 Rolea B'ier (commune), a commune in Rolea B'ier district